Gülsin Onay (born 12 September 1954) is a leading Turkish concert pianist of German descent, based in Cambridge, England.

Education

Born into a musical family, Gülsin Onay began to play the piano at the age of three. Her first teacher was her mother.

When she was 6 years old, Gülsin Onay gave her first concert on TRT Radio Istanbul. At the age of 10, she received a special government scholarship under the  Üstün Yetenekli Çocuklar Kanunu (Law for Exceptionally Talented Children), which enabled her to study first in Ankara with Mithat Fenmen and Ahmed Adnan Saygun, and two years later at the Paris Conservatory, where her teachers were Pierre Sancan, Monique Haas, Pierre Fiquet and Nadia Boulanger. At the age of 16 she graduated with the Premier Prix de Piano. She continued her studies with Bernhard Ebert at the Musikhochschule Hannover.

Career

At the outset of her career Onay took prizes in leading competitions, including the Marguerite Long-Jacques Thibaud Piano Competition (Paris) and the Ferruccio Busoni International Piano Competition (Bolzano). Onay's international career has spanned 80 countries across all continents, from Venezuela to Japan. She has played with orchestras including Dresden Staatskapelle, English Chamber Orchestra, Japan Philharmonic, Munich Radio Symphony, Philharmonia Orchestra, Royal Philharmonic, St Petersburg Philharmonic, Tokyo Symphony, Warsaw Philharmonic and Vienna Symphony Orchestras, under such conductors as Vladimir Ashkenazy, Erich Bergel, Michael Boder, Andrey Boreyko, Jörg Faerber, Edward Gardner, Neeme Järvi, Emmanuel Krivine, Ingo Metzmacher, Esa-Pekka Salonen, Jose Serebrier, Vassily Sinaisky, Stanislaw Wislocki and Lothar Zagrosek. Onay's festival appearances include Berlin, Warsaw, Granada, Mozartfest Würzburg, Newport, Schleswig-Holstein and Istanbul.

An exceptional Chopin interpreter, Onay was in 2007 honoured with the award of a State Medal by the Polish nation. She is also acknowledged worldwide as the finest interpreter of the music of Ahmed Adnan Saygun, whose works feature prominently in her concerts and recordings, and whose Second Piano Concerto (which she has premiered in Turkey and abroad) was dedicated to her. Other contemporary composers who have dedicated works to her are Hubert Stuppner, Denis Dufour, Bujor Hoinic, Jean-Louis Petit, Muhiddin Dürrüoğlu and Marc-André Hamelin. She has also given premieres of concertos by Stuppner and Tabakov.

Onay holds the titles of State Artist in her native Turkey, and of soloist for the Presidential Symphony Orchestra in Ankara. She is “Artist in Residence” at Bilkent University in Ankara and holds an honorary doctorate degrees from Boğaziçi University in Istanbul, and from Hacettepe University in Ankara. The Sevda-Cenap And Music Foundation awarded its prestigious 2007 Honorary Award Gold Medal to Onay, and she was named "Pianist of the Year" in the 2011 Donizetti Classical Music Awards. In 2014 she was awarded the Honorary Medal of the 42nd Istanbul Music Festival, and the Honorary Medal of the Bodrum Music Festival in 2018.

Onay is Artistic Advisor of the Gümüşlük International Classical Music Festival.

Onay is Online Master Teacher at iClassical Academy with whom she has recorded several online Masterclasses.

Recordings

"An exceptional pianist, endowed with virtuosic brilliance and boundless energy, and an interpretive power both intelligent and emotionally sensitive", Onay has recorded 20 albums. Her 2007 CD, featuring live concert recordings of Tchaikovsky's 1st and Rachmaninov's 3rd Piano Concerto, has been acclaimed by critics and virtuosi alike. In 2008 CPO released her recording of both Saygun concertos with the Bilkent Symphony Orchestra and Howard Griffiths, to widespread critical acclaim. Most recently, the American label VAI has released a live DVD of her performances of the Grieg Concerto and the Saint-Saëns 2nd Concerto, to be followed in early 2011 by the first of two live recital DVDs, featuring her critically acclaimed performances from the Miami International Piano Festival.

Many of Ms. Onay's concerts have been broadcast on European radio and television, and in the USA on National Public Radio.

Honours

 Honorary doctorate degrees from Boğaziçi University in Istanbul, and from Hacettepe University in Ankara.
 1987 State Artist of the Republic of Turkey.
 2003 Appointed Goodwill Ambassador by the Turkish national committee of UNICEF.
 2007 Gold Cross of Merit of the Polish nation, awarded by the Polish President Lech Kaczyński for her contributions to Polish culture through her outstanding performances of the music of Chopin.
 2007 Honorary Award Medal of the Sevda-Cenap And Music Foundation.
 2011 “Pianist of the Year” Donizetti Classical Music Awards.
 2012 Melvin Jones Fellowship.
 2014 Honorary Medal of the 42nd Istanbul Music Festival.
 2018 Honorary Medal of the Bodrum Music Festival.

Other

Onay's mother is the daughter of the famous Turkish mathematician and scientist Kerim Erim. Her father is the German violinist Joachim Reusch. Onay's son Erkin Onay is a professional violinist. He is currently a concertmaster of the orchestra of the Ankara State Opera and Ballet. Onay is married to Tony Scholl, Professor of Algebra and Number Theory at Cambridge University.

References

External links 
 
Music of Saygun

Living people
Turkish classical pianists
Turkish women pianists
State Artists of Turkey
1954 births
Turkish people of German descent
Hochschule für Musik, Theater und Medien Hannover alumni
Musicians from Istanbul
Conservatoire de Paris alumni
21st-century classical pianists
21st-century women pianists